Alexander Vinogradov may refer to:

 Alexander Vinogradov (bass) (born 1976), Russian bass opera singer
 Alexander Pavlovich Vinogradov (1895–1975), Soviet geochemist
 Alexander Vinogradov (ice hockey) (1918–1988), Russian ice hockey player

See also
 Aleksandr Vinogradov (disambiguation)